Big Grove Township is one of twenty townships in Benton County, Iowa, USA.  As of the 2000 census, its population was 230.

History
Big Grove Township was organized in 1856.

Geography
According to the United States Census Bureau, Big Grove Township covers an area of 35.93 square miles (93.07 square kilometers).

Unincorporated towns
 Geneva at 
(This list is based on USGS data and may include former settlements.)

Adjacent townships
 Jackson Township (north)
 Taylor Township (northeast)
 Eden Township (east)
 Eldorado Township (southeast)
 Union Township (south)
 Kane Township (southwest)
 Homer Township (west)
 Monroe Township (northwest)

Cemeteries
The township contains these four cemeteries: Bishop Grove, Indian, LaRue and Van Metre.

School districts
 Benton Community School District
 Vinton-Shellsburg Community School District

Political districts
 Iowa's 3rd congressional district
 State House District 39
 State Senate District 20

References
 United States Census Bureau 2007 TIGER/Line Shapefiles
 United States Board on Geographic Names (GNIS)
 United States National Atlas

External links
 US-Counties.com
 City-Data.com

Townships in Benton County, Iowa
Cedar Rapids, Iowa metropolitan area
Townships in Iowa
1856 establishments in Iowa
Populated places established in 1856